Zavrh is a remote dispersed settlement north of Ravnik in the Municipality of Bloke in the Inner Carniola region of Slovenia.

References

External links

Zavrh on Geopedia

Populated places in the Municipality of Bloke